Spermozoros impolitus is a species of insect in the order Zoraptera.

This species was formerly a member of the genus Zorotypus.

Natural history
Individual Spermozoros impolitus resemble termites in appearance. They are found in decaying tree trunks and eat fungi.

Reproduction
Most Zorapterans copulate during mating, but the male Z. impolitus has a distinct and primitive form of mating behaviour in which the male Z. impolitus produces a spermatophore, a packaged single sperm, which it attaches to the abdomen of a female ground louse. The female ground louse initiates the intercourse by advancing towards the male and brushing the antenna on the body of the male. If the male ground louse is aroused, it moves behind the female and carries out a mating display which comprises lowering the head, vibrating the antennae and moving back and forth repeatedly. The mating concludes with the male moving under the female and attaching the spermatophore to the abdomen of the female. The female then shifts the spermatophore into the reproductive tract.

Such external transfer of sperm is also found in ancient wingless groups like springtails, but in their case, the male deposits its spermatophore on the ground from where the female lifts the sac for transfer to its genital aperture. This mating behaviour is considered to be an intermediate step in the evolution of copulation.

This is the only known insect in the world to feature a giant single spermatozoon. The giant spermatozoon is thought to have evolved in this manner so as to act like a mating plug.

References

Zoraptera
Insects of Malaysia
Insects described in 2013